Adisutjipto (or Adisucipto) Airport  is an airport serving the Yogyakarta area on the island of Java, Indonesia. It was formerly the principal international airport serving this area. The airport is located in the Sleman Regency, in the Yogyakarta Special Region, on the north-east outskirts of the city, near the Prambanan historic temple site.

Adisutjipto Airport was once the fourth busiest airport in the region of Java–Bali, after Soekarno–Hatta International Airport (CGK) in Jakarta, Juanda International Airport (SUB) in Surabaya, and Ngurah Rai International Airport (DPS) in Bali. The number of passengers flying through Adisucipto International Airport in Yogyakarta, throughout 2016 increased by approximately 13 percent compared to 2015.  7.2 million passengers were recorded in 2016 whereas in 2015, the number was 6.38 million. All jet-powered flights were relocated to the new international airport on 29 March 2020.

History

Adisutjipto Airport was preceded by a landing ground at Maguwo, which was used before and during the Second World War.  The current airport is named after Agustinus Adisucipto, a pilot who was killed during an attack on Maguwo by the Dutch on 29 July 1947, when his flight, the Dakota VT-CLA, was shot down.  Based on the decision of the head of the Air Force Staff No. 76 of 1952 on 17 August 1952, the name of Maguwo air base was changed to Adisutjipto airbase.

Since 1959, Adisutjipto Airport was made for the Republic of Indonesia Air Force Academy (AAU).  In 1964, the Directorate General of Civil Aviation, with its decision and with the approval of the Indonesian Air Force, AdiSutjipto Jogjakarta Airport became a combined civil and military airport.  In 1972, the first expansion of the civil air terminal was carried out.  Then in 1977, the terminal was expanded again because of the increasing volume of flights.  On 1 April 1992, in accordance with Government Regulation No. 48 of 1992, Adisutjipto Airport was officially entered into the management of Angkasa Pura I Corporation.  On 2 January 1993, its status was changed to PT (PERSERO) Angkasa Pura I.

The airport was heavily damaged by the 2006 Yogyakarta earthquake, and had to be closed for two days.  Some parts of the runway were cracked, and the departure lounge collapsed.  Most flights were cancelled or rerouted to Adisumarmo International Airport, Solo.  After the airport returned to service on 30 May 2006, all passengers used the international lounge until the new domestic departure lounge was ready.  During this period, passenger comfort was affected as the international lounge was designed only for about 100 passengers at a time.  The airport was closed for several days due to the 2010 Mount Merapi eruption, as the volcanic ash could endanger the safety of flights.  During this period, passengers were diverted to Adisumarmo International Airport in Solo, Achmad Yani International Airport in Semarang, or transferred to another mode of transportation to the city of Yogyakarta.

International routes

Before Adisutjipto became an international airport, Yogyakarta relied on Bali and Jakarta for its international flights.  It became an international airport on 21 February 2004, with the first flight to Kuala Lumpur, Malaysia, operated by the Indonesian flag carrier Garuda Indonesia.  This was the successful conclusion to the city's efforts of over 30 years to have its own international airport.  One month later, Garuda Indonesia operated its second international flight, to Singapore.  Due to low demand, Garuda Indonesia ceased international flights from the airport in November 2006.  International flights resumed on 30 January 2008 when AirAsia began to fly the Yogyakarta to Kuala Lumpur route using Airbus A320 aircraft.  From 1 February 2008, Malaysia Airlines started to serve the Yogyakarta to Kuala Lumpur route operating Boeing 737-400 aircraft, but ceased operation in 2011.  In April 2008, AirAsia raised the frequency of its Yogyakarta to Kuala Lumpur flights from four times weekly to daily.  In December 2008, Garuda Indonesia resumed its Yogyakarta to Singapore flight, operating three times weekly, but ceased in 2009.  AirAsia started to fly a Yogyakarta to Singapore flight on 24 March 2009, operating daily.  SilkAir, a subsidiary of Singapore Airlines, began operating Yogyakarta to Singapore route from 25 October 2013.

Development

Adisucipto has being redeveloped to cope with the increasing number of passengers. The location of this airport is unusual since the passenger terminal is only about 10 metres from a railway line. A long-range plan has been developed to build Adisucipto as a 'fused terminal', by building a railway station and bus terminal in the airport. There is still a problem of limited availability of land. An underpass connecting the terminal building and a new carpark (to the north of the railway) has been completed. The construction of the new Maguwo Station to the north of the airport has also been completed. In August 2015, a new Terminal B was open for operation. The new terminal handles all international traffic, and the domestic service of some low-cost carriers. The runway will then be  in length. Plans also call to widen the aircraft parking apron, so that it will be able to handle eleven Boeing 737-400s and two Boeing 767-300ERs, and expansion of the terminal. Currently, the airport has a secondary taxiway beside having a primary taxiway to the south of the apron. This taxiway is to the east of the apron, and is used to connect the apron to the eastern (or Runway 27) end of the runway. Previously, aircraft had to backtrack down the runway which caused a bottleneck and reduced the number of operations at the airport per hour.

New airport

The limited availability of land around the airport, and over-capacity caused the government to plan to relocate the airport to Temon in Kulon Progo Regency.  PT Angkasa Pura I and Yogyakarta provincial government has decided to build the new airport in Kulonprogo (include the airport city).  It will be built without central government funding, and will be built by joint venture between PT Angkasa Pura I and GVK Group from India with 51 and 49 percent shares, respectively.  The new airport can accommodate up to 30 million passengers per year, and expected to boost the tourism economy, trade and industry of the country.  Scheduled to be completed in 2019, and fully operated in 2020.

As of 29 March 2020, Adisutjipto will only serve limited commercial, military, and private aviation.

Airlines and destinations

Passenger

Statistics
Adisucipto International Airport was one of the busiest in the Java–Bali region.  It had faced a growing trend in passengers over the past decade.  The table below is based on data from PT Angkasa Pura I, who is responsible for management of the airport.

Ground transportation

Bus
Shuttle buses serve several destinations from Adisucipto Airport; it is served by a bus operator DAMRI.  These fares are valid as of 20 July 2016.

Trans Jogja, a bus rapid transit (BRT) of Yogyakarta opened several routes passing through the Adisucipto Airport which connects passengers to destinations around Yogyakarta, along with other Trans Jogja routes.

Car and taxi
The airport is located in Yogya to Solo road km. 9, which is a part of Indonesian National Route 17, and connects Adisucipto Airport to Yogyakarta city centre, as well as Solo.  There is extensive car and motorcycle parking space available.  Car rental and taxis are available.

Rail
Adisucipto Airport is connected with Maguwo Station. Maguwo Station is equipped with a tunnel which connects passengers to the airport.

Accidents and incidents
On 13 January 1985, a Vickers Viscount PK-RVT of Mandala Airlines was damaged beyond economic repair after it made a belly landing.
On 13 January 1995, Garuda Indonesia's Boeing 737-300 PK-GWF overran the runway by about 50 metres due to the runway being wet with rain; there were no casualties.
On 7 March 2007, Garuda Indonesia Flight 200, a Boeing 737-400 PK-GZC, came in too fast, bounced twice, overran the runway and burst into flames upon landing from Jakarta; 21 passengers and a crew member were killed in this accident.  This was the first fatal incident at Adisucipto Airport.
On 20 December 2011, Sriwijaya Air Flight 230, operated by Boeing 737-300 PK-CKM, overran the runway as it was not on a stabilised landing criteria and came in too fast; there were no casualties.
On 6 November 2015, Batik Air flight 6380, a Boeing 737-9GP(ER) PK-LBO, overran the runway on landing by 100 metres which caused the nose gear to collapse; no casualties were reported.
On 1 February 2017, Garuda Indonesia Flight 258, a Boeing 737-800 registered PK-GNK overran the runway; all 123 passengers on board survived.
On 23 October 2020, the landing gear of Citilink Flight 1107, an ATR 72-600, is struck by a kite during the landing at the airport; the aircraft is not damaged.

Beside those accidents, there are some other minor incidents mainly because of landing in rain but without any casualties.

References

External links

Adisutjipto International Airport official website

Sleman Regency
Airports in the Special Region of Yogyakarta
Indonesian Air Force bases